The Chase CG-14, also known as the G-14 or Model MS.1, was an assault glider manufactured by Chase Aircraft for the United States Army Air Forces during the Second World War. The aircraft failed to progress beyond the prototype stage, being overtaken by larger, improved glider designs.

Design and development
The first aircraft to be developed by Chase after its founding in 1943, the CG-14 was developed in preference to the Laister-Kauffman CG-10. Constructed from marine-grade mahogany, as spruce was being used by the war effort in higher priority projects, the XG-14 featured improved crash protection when compared to preceding gliders.

Operational history
The XCG-14 made its maiden flight on January 4, 1945, and following successful flight trials the aircraft was developed into two improved versions, the wood-and-metal XCG-14A and the enlarged YCG-14A.

The CG-14 was one of the few glider projects to be continued after the end of the war; however, it was quickly superseded by an improved aircraft, the XCG-18.

Variants
Chase MS.1
Company designation for the XCG-14
XCG-14
First prototype, all-wooden. 16 seats.
XCG-14A
Wood and metal version of XCG-14. 24 seats.
YCG-14A/YG-14A
Production prototype version of XCG-14A, superseded by XCG-14B.
Chase MS.7
Company designation for the XCG-14B
XCG-14B/XG-14B
Enlarged, improved variant, redesignated XCG-18, 2 built.

Specifications (XCG-14)

See also

References

Notes

Bibliography

 
 
 
 
 

G-014
1940s United States military gliders
1940s United States military transport aircraft
High-wing aircraft
Aircraft first flown in 1945